Devaramane is a village in Mudigere Taluk, Chikkamagaluru district in the state of Karnataka, India. The village is renowned for its Kalabhairaveshwara temple.Road to reach temple is rough and not in best condition.

Transport
By Road: Regular buses ply from Bengaluru (259 km), Chikkamagaluru (30  km), Hassan (62 km), Mangaluru (124 km), Mysuru (149 km) to Mudigere.
Nearest Railway: Hassan (about 32 km from Mudigere) Banavara and Arasikere are also near Mudigere.
Nearest Airport:Mangalore about 124 km from Mudigere.

Agriculture and commerce
The primary mode of employment in the Devaramane region is agriculture. Crops grown include coffee, rice, finger millet, pepper, cardamom with paddy being dominant.

See also
 Hoysala architecture
 Shravanabelagola

External links

 Official website of devaramane temple
 Government website of Mudigere Town
  Devaramane Trekking and Haarlu Flowers
  Minchukallu trek which starts from Devaramane

Villages in Chikkamagaluru district